André Marcon (born 6 July 1948) is a French actor. In 1980 he starred in Le Voyage en douce directed by Michel Deville.

Selected filmography 
 Le Voyage en douce (1980)
 Stolen Life (1998)
 Peau d'Ange (2002)
 The Page Turner (2006)
 Le Cri (2006)
 36 Views from the Pic Saint-Loup (2009)
 Au galop (2012)
 On the Other Side of the Tracks (2012)
 Gare du Nord (2013)
 Me, Myself and Mum (2013)
 A Perfect Man (2015)
 Marguerite (2015)
 Things to Come (2016)
 See You Up There (2017)
 Volontaire (2018)
 An Officer and a Spy (2019)
 A Radiant Girl (2021)
 Lost Illusions (2021)
 The Mad Women's Ball (2021)

References

External links

 

French male film actors
Living people
1948 births
20th-century French male actors
21st-century French male actors
French male stage actors
French male television actors